Poolamacca Station is a pastoral lease that operates as a sheep station in the outback of New South Wales.

The abandoned township of Tarrawingee is situated within the boundaries of the station.

The property was established in the 1860s with the first owners of the run being Messrs Jones and Goode. In 1867 a shepherd staged a hoax with a white quartz gold find that lead to an aborted gold rush to the area. The first property in the area was Mount Gipps Station in 1865, with Corona, Mundi Mundi and Poolamacca being established shortly afterwards.

Sidney Kidman worked at Poolamacca during the 1870s as a boundary rider and stockman.

In 1877 the property was put up for auction by the trustees of the estate of Messrs E. M. Bagot and G. Bennett. The property comprised ten separate runs including the 64,000 acre Bijerkerno run to the 25,000 acre Torrowangee run.

John Brougham acquired a half share in Poolamacca in 1889 and later secured the lease outright. Brougham remained at Poolamacca until 1915 when he moved to Adelaide. In 1892 approximately 50 Aboriginal people, were moved to Poolamacca station which "under the regime of the late owner, Mr J. Brougham, constituted a sanctuary for the last remaining Aboriginal inhabitants of the Barrier Ranges and adjacent areas".

The lease was later split into two properties: Poolamacca and Wilangee in the 1920s.

Moss Smith sold the property in 1927 to the Pastoral company of Adelaide following the death of his daughter whose body was found buried in a warren in Poolamacca late the year before after she had gone missing for four months.

See also
List of ranches and stations

References

Stations (Australian agriculture)
Pastoral leases in New South Wales